The Shanghai–Nanjing Riverside high-speed railway is a high-speed railway line in Jiangsu, China. It is expected to open in 2023.

History 
Installation of the rails began on 1 September 2022.

Route 
Between Nanjing South and Jiangning, the line runs parallel to the Nanjing–Hangzhou high-speed railway. Between Zhangjiagang and Taicang, the line runs parallel to the Shanghai–Suzhou–Nantong railway.

Stations

References 

High-speed railway lines in China
High-speed railway lines under construction